Hiram Knowles (January 18, 1834 – April 6, 1911) was a United States district judge of the United States District Court for the District of Montana.

Education and career

Born in Hampden, Maine, Knowles attended Antioch College and received a Bachelor of Laws from Harvard Law School in 1860. He was in private practice in Keokuk, Iowa from 1860 to 1862, then in Dayton, Missouri in 1862 and in Humboldt County, Nevada Territory from 1862 to 1863. He was a district attorney of Humboldt County, Nevada Territory (State of Nevada from October 31, 1864) from 1863 to 1864, and a Humboldt County probate judge from 1864 to 1865 before resuming his private practice in Deer Lodge, Montana Territory from 1866 to 1868. He was an Associate Justice of the Supreme Court of the Territory of Montana from 1868 to 1879. He was again in private practice in Butte, Montana Territory (State of Montana from November 8, 1889) from 1879 to 1890.

Federal judicial service

On January 6, 1890, Knowles was nominated by President Benjamin Harrison to a new seat on the United States District Court for the District of Montana created by 25 Stat. 676. He was confirmed by the United States Senate on February 21, 1890, and received his commission the same day. Knowles retired from the bench on April 15, 1904. He returned to private practice in Missoula, Montana until his death on April 6, 1911, near Idaho Falls, Idaho.

References

Sources
 

1834 births
1911 deaths
Harvard Law School alumni
Montana Territory judges
Judges of the United States District Court for the District of Montana
United States federal judges appointed by Benjamin Harrison
19th-century American judges
People from Hampden, Maine
Montana lawyers
Antioch College alumni
Iowa lawyers
People from Butte, Montana
People from Humboldt County, Nevada
19th-century American politicians